The 2014 Conference USA men's soccer tournament was the twentieth edition of the Conference USA Men's Soccer Tournament. The tournament decided the Conference USA champion and guaranteed representative into the 2014 NCAA Division I Men's Soccer Championship. The tournament was hosted by Old Dominion University and the games were played at the Old Dominion Soccer Complex.

Bracket

Schedule

Quarterfinals

Semifinals

Final

Statistics

Goalscorers

Awards

All-Tournament team
Sidney Rivera, Old Dominion (Offensive MVP)
David Macsicza, Old Dominion (Defensive MVP)
Ryan Condotta, Old Dominion
Jesse Miralrio, Old Dominion
Mahamoudou Kaba, South Carolina
Mikkel Knudsen, South Carolina
Braeden Troyer, South Carolina
Marco Velez, South Carolina
Kyle Parker, Charlotte
Darion Copeland, UAB
Rami Dajani, UAB

References

External links
 

Conference USA Men's Soccer Tournament
Tournament
Conference USA Men's Soccer Tournament
Conference USA Men's Soccer Tournament